Kommunar is a rural locality (a settlement) and the administrative center of Kommunarovskoye Rural Settlement, Leninsky District, Volgograd Oblast, Russia. The population was 882 as of 2010. There are 19 streets.

Geography 
Kommunar is located on the Caspian Depression, 84 km northeast of Leninsk (the district's administrative centre) by road. Kovylny is the nearest rural locality.

References 

Rural localities in Leninsky District, Volgograd Oblast